Svenja Würth (born 20 August 1993) is a German ski jumper and nordic combined skier.

Nordic combined results

World Championships

References

External links

1993 births
Living people
German female ski jumpers
German female Nordic combined skiers
FIS Nordic World Ski Championships medalists in ski jumping
21st-century German women